

Political Affiliation
RFP - Rehoboth Freedom Party

See also
Namibia
Baster
Rehoboth, Namibia
Bantustans in South West Africa
Apartheid
Presidents of Namibia
Prime Ministers of Namibia

External links
World Statesmen – Namibia Homelands

Apartheid in South West Africa
Bantustans in South West Africa
Coloured Namibian people